Venus Barbata ('Bearded Venus') was an epithet of the goddess Venus among the Romans. Macrobius also mentions a statue of Venus in Cyprus, representing the goddess with a beard, in female attire, but resembling in her whole figure that of a man (see also Aphroditus). The idea of Venus thus being a mixture of the male and female nature seems to belong to a very late period of antiquity.

The idea of Venus having a double-sexed nature has the same double meaning, in the mythological sense, that there is not only a Luna, but also a Lunus. The name Venus in itself, is masculine in its termination, and it was perceived that the goddess becomes the god and the god the goddess sometimes.

See also
Venus Castina

Notes

References

Androgynous and hermaphroditic deities
Barbata